WMLN-FM (91.5 FM) is a radio station located on the scenic campus of Curry College in Milton, MA. WMLN is supervised by a faculty member, but is currently student-run. It broadcasts a college radio block format featuring a variety in music, [Oldies, Classic Rock, Top 40, Country, Hip-Hop, Rock and Alternative] live talk-shows and live coverage of Curry College sports. WMLN is licensed to Curry College in Milton, Massachusetts, United States and covers the campus and the Milton-Boston area. WMLN is on the FM dial at 91.5 and broadcasts continuously throughout the year.

WMLN features programming from Westwood One and AP Radio. From 1968 till 1974, WVAC, the "Voice at Curry", was a carrier-current AM station at Curry College, which later became WMLN-FM on April 1, 1975.

References

External links

MLN
Radio stations established in 1975
1975 establishments in Massachusetts
Milton, Massachusetts
Mass media in Norfolk County, Massachusetts